Rikke Nielsen (born April 9, 1977, in Fjerritslev, Denmark) is a former Danish handballer. She previously played for Aalborg DH, and before that she played for the German club HC Leipzig. Before this she played for Aalborg DH and its parent club HS Nord. She won silver medals at the European Championships in 2004. In all she played 54 national games and scored 68 goals. Her first national game was September 25, 2003.

External links 
 Rikke Nielsen's career is over, ekstrabladet.dk 
 Player stats for national team (search for Rikke Nielsen), Danish Handball Federation 

Danish female handball players
1977 births
Living people
People from Jammerbugt Municipality
Sportspeople from the North Jutland Region
Danish expatriate sportspeople in Germany